Ohakune railway station is a station on the North Island Main Trunk (NIMT), it served the town of Ohakune in the Manawatū-Whanganui region of New Zealand. It was called Ohakune Junction from 10 August 1926 until Raetihi Branch closed in 1968, to avoid confusion with Ohakune Town station on that branch. It was the second highest operating railway station in New Zealand, after National Park.

When the Overlander was replaced by the Northern Explorer in 2012, the service to Ohakune was reduced to one train a day on six days a week. Scheduled services to Ohakune were suspended from December 2021 to 25 September 2022.

History

The Class B station was built about 1908 and was important in the growth of Ohakune. Trains calling have included The Overlander, Blue Streak, Scenic Daylight, Daylight Limited, Northerner, Silver Star and Night Limited.

Surveying for the route between Hīhītahi and Piriaka began in 1894. However, goods traffic between Mataroa and Ohakune didn't begin until Saturday 7 March 1908. Initial plans were for NZR to take over from PWD in June 1908, but NZR reported on 25 September 1908, "Obtaining possession of office and other buildings." In July newspapers said the station and railway houses were still bring built. Although the rails completing the NIMT were laid on 3 August 1908, they said the yard at Ohakune wasn't complete and there was still no platform in November.

On Monday 9 November 1908 a stationmaster was appointed and the first public train from Wellington to Auckland ran, with passengers staying overnight in Ohakune from 8pm to 6am. In January 1909 the General Manager gave permission for passengers to sleep in the trains, owing to a lack of accommodation in the town. On 20 November 1908 NZR sent a note to PWD asking for expedition in completing the platform, as it was, "exceedingly inconvenient and dangerous for passengers landing in the dark". NZR took over from PWD on 14 February 1909, from Erua, via Ohakune to Waiouru.

The first through expresses began on 14 February 1909 and stopped at Ohakune. By July 1909 a footwarmer house had been built by PWD for £54.4.4 and there was a bookstall, a special station building, with District Engineer's office, luggage, stationmaster's, lobby, and ladies rooms, a lengthened and asphalted platform, cart approach, goods shed, loading bank, cattle and sheep yards, crane, water service, coal accommodation, engine turntable, engine shed, stationmaster's house and urinal.

Ohakune was one of the stations for which annual returns of traffic were published.

On 12 April 1905 the engine shed burnt down. A new  by  shed could take five locomotives. In 1910 an ash pit was added. On 7 December 1923 that shed was destroyed by fire. In 1929 the  turntable was sent to Huntly and replaced by a  turntable for £1800. By 1960 the depot was only being used by Raetihi branch engines. It again caught fire on 17 February 1967.

Railway houses were built in 1905, 1906, 1907, 1908, 1912, 1914 and 1965 and a hostel for female refreshment room staff on Tyne Road in 1940.

From December 1966 Centralised Traffic Control replaced tablet signalling.

References

External links
Ohakune railway station on 1:50,000 map
Ohakune railway station on Google Street View
DoC – Mangawhero Forest Walk and Rimu Walk start from a short walk up the road under the railway bridge
National Library photo – Ohakune Railway Station and yards, between 1912 and 1916
Ohakune Coach Road – history of travel around 1908 with photos
Sir George Grey Special Collections, Auckland Libraries photos – 1908 – connecting coaches, train and coaches, loco shed, rails in bush and railway station, with train
1909 loco shed and station, express at station, bridge, houses and station
1910 station buildings
1923 loco shed fire
2011 flickr photo of station in snow

Railway stations in New Zealand
Ruapehu District
Railway stations opened in 1908
Rail transport in Manawatū-Whanganui
1908 establishments in New Zealand
Buildings and structures in Manawatū-Whanganui
Heritage New Zealand Category 2 historic places in Manawatū-Whanganui